Aho or AHO may refer to:

People
 Aho (name), Finnish surname (article includes list of people with the name)
 'Aho'eitu, figure in Tongan oral history or mythology
 Aho, Sinhalese - Desperate yell before an impending disaster

Places
 Aho, North Carolina, unincorporated community and river in North Carolina, United States.
 Aho-dong, village in North Korea
 Fertilia Airport in Alghero, Sardinia (IATA airport code AHO)
 Netherlands Antilles, former IAAF country code AHO

Other uses
 , a phrase in the Kansai dialect of Japanese, meaning "idiot", see Baka (Japanese word)#Dialectal
 Aboriginal Housing Office, a statutory authority in New South Wales, Australia
 Oslo School of Architecture and Design (AHO)
 Aho report, a 2006 report Creating an innovative Europe
 Aho & Soldan, a Finnish film production company (1925–61)
 2395 Aho, an asteroid
 Anti-Harassment Order, a form of restraining order

See also
 Ahoy (disambiguation)
 
 AH (disambiguation)